The Flag Officer, Surface Flotilla was a senior British Royal Navy appointment from 1990 to 2002.

When the post of Commander-in-Chief Fleet was created in 1971, three major subordinate appointments were also created: First Flotilla, Second Flotilla and Flag Officer, Carriers and Amphibious Ships, each held by a rear-admiral. In 1990 the First Flotilla was re-designated Surface Flotilla. In April 1992, the system was changed when the Third Flotilla was abolished and the remaining two flotilla commanders became: Flag Officer, Surface Flotilla – responsible for operational readiness and training – and Flag Officer, UK Task Group – who would command any deployed task group.

Exercise Teamwork was a major NATO biennial exercise in defense of Norway against a Soviet land and maritime threat. Teamwork '92 was the largest NATO exercise for more than a decade. Held in the northern spring of 1992, it included a total of over 200 ships and 300 aircraft, held in the North Atlantic.

Subordinate squadrons

Flag Officer Surface Flotilla

Flag officers commanding

Included:
 Vice-Admiral A. Peter Woodhead: 1990 – September 1991
 Rear-Admiral A. Bruce Richardson: September 1991 – April 1992 
 Vice-Admiral the Hon. Sir Nicholas Hill-Norton: April–November 1992 
 Vice-Admiral Sir Michael C. Boyce: November 1992 – April 1995 
 Vice-Admiral Sir John Brigstocke: April 1995 – July 1997 
 Rear-Admiral Peter M. Franklyn: July 1997 – April 2000 
 Rear-Admiral Ian A. Forbes: April 2000 – November 2001 
 Rear-Admiral Alexander Backus: November 2001 – 2002

Notes

References 
 
 Mackie, Colin. (2018) "Royal Navy Senior Appointments from 1865" (PDF). gulabin.com. Colin Mackie. Scotland, UK.
 Roberts, John (2009). Safeguarding the Nation: The Story of the Modern Royal Navy. Barnsley, England: Seaforth Publishing. .
 Smith, Gordon. (2015) "Royal Navy Organisation and Ship Deployment 1947–2013:FLEET ORGANISATION, 1981–2002". www.naval-history.net. Gordon Smith.

 

S
Royal Navy flotillas
Military units and formations established in 1990
Military units and formations disestablished in 2002